The Road Back Home is the second compilation album by the Swedish progressive rock band The Flower Kings.
It is a double album with some of the group's shorter and more straightforward songs, rather than their usual long/complex epic songs. All of the songs have been remastered and most have been remixed. Some have even been reworked, with new guitar solos, or new lead vocals, or different backing vocals, etc.

Roine Stolt personally made all the remakes, between December 2006 and January 2007, and gives comments for each track in the album's booklet. The album includes a previously unreleased track from The Rainmaker sessions and a cover version of Genesis' famous song "The Cinema Show".

Track listing
All songs by Roine Stolt except where noted.

Disc One

Disc Two

Personnel
The Flower Kings
 Roine Stolt: lead and backing vocals, guitars, keyboards, percussion (all); bass guitar (Space Revolver, "Paradox Hotel")
 Tomas Bodin: keyboards (all); backing vocal ("Touch My Heaven")
 Hasse Fröberg: lead and backing vocals, guitars (all, except "My Cosmic Lover", "The Road Back Home", "Rhythm of the Sea")
 Michael Stolt: bass guitar (1995-1999); vocal ("My Cosmic Lover")
 Jaime Salazar: drums, percussion (1995-2001)
 Jonas Reingold: bass guitar, vocals (2000-2006)
 Zoltan Csörsz: drums (2002-2004)
 Daniel Gildenlöw: vocals (2002)
 Marcus Liliequist: drums, vocals (2006)

Guests
 Ulf Wallander: soprano and tenor saxophones (1995-1997, 2000-2002)
 Hasse Bruniusson: percussion, voices (1996-2004)
 Håkan Almkvist: sitar, tabla (1997)

References

2007 compilation albums
The Flower Kings albums
Inside Out Music compilation albums